Rem Viktorovich Khokhlov (born July 15, 1926 in Livny; died August 8, 1977 in Moscow) was a Soviet physicist and university teacher, rector of Lomonosov Moscow State University, one of the founders of nonlinear optics.

Biography 
Khokhlov was born in the family of political officer and graduate of the Moscow Energetic Institute Viktor Khristoforovich Khokhlov and physicist Maria Yakovlevna. He graduated from a seven-year school in 1941 and worked in a car workshop during the Great Patriotic War. In 1944, he externally passed exams in high school and began to study at the Moscow Aviation Institute. In 1945, he moved to the Physics department at Moscow State University, where he spent his whole life. After graduating from university in 1948, he entered graduate school at the Department of Oscillation Physics. In 1952 he defended his thesis with the title of candidate of physical and mathematical sciences(PhD). With his investigations into vibrational physics he belonged to the third generation of the vibration physics school of Leonid I. Mandelstam and Nikolai D. Papaleksi. In 1959, he was sent to a one-year study visit to the United States at Stanford University. In 1962 he was awarded a doctorate (habilitation)  in doctoral studies. Khokhlov organized together with S. A. Akhmanov, the first laboratory for nonlinear optics of the Soviet Union at the Lomonosov Moscow State University.

Selected publications 
 Krasnushkin P. E., Khokhlov R. V. Spatial beats in coupled wave guides. National Research Council of Canada, 1952.
 
 Kaner, V.V., Rudenko, O.V., Khokhlov, R.V. Theory Of Nonlinear Oscillations In Acoustic Resonators. Sov Phys Acoust. 1977

References

Honors 
 Order of Lenin
 Order of the Red Banner of Labor
 Jubilee Medal "In Commemoration of the 100th Anniversary of the Birth of Vladimir Ilyich Lenin"
 Lenin Prize (1970)
 Foreign member of the Bulgarian Academy of Sciences
 State Prize of the USSR (postum (1985)
 Namesake for the asteroid (3739) Rem (posthumously 1993)

Footnotes 

1926 births
People from Livny
1977 deaths
Soviet physicists
Optical physicists
Theoretical physicists
Moscow State University alumni
Academic staff of Moscow State University
Lenin Prize winners
Full Members of the USSR Academy of Sciences
Recipients of the USSR State Prize
Burials at Novodevichy Cemetery
Rectors of Moscow State University